Bolingbroke Castle is a ruined castle in Bolingbroke (now Old Bolingbroke) in Lincolnshire, England.

Construction

Most of the castle is built of Spilsby greenstone, as are several nearby churches. The local greenstone is a limestone that proved to be porous, prone to rapid deterioration when exposed to weather and a substandard building material. The castle was constructed as an irregular polygonal enclosure. The castle is one of the earliest examples of a uniform castle designed and built without a keep. The curtain wall was up to  feet thick and defended by five D-shaped towers and a twin-towered gate house.

Similar to another castle built by Ranulf during the same period at Beeston in Cheshire, Bolingbroke had no inner defensive keep. The castle relied instead on thick walls and the five D shaped defensive corner towers. Some design similarities are noted with the contemporary castle at Boulogne-sur-Mer, France that was also constructed without a central donjon.

History
The area was first fortified by the Saxons in the 6th or 7th century. In the 12th century the Normans built a Motte-and-bailey on a nearby hill above the settlement of Bolingbroke.
The present structure was founded by Ranulf, Earl of Chester, in 1220 shortly after he returned from the Fifth Crusade.

Ranulf died in 1232 without a male heir, and his titles, lands and castles passed to his sisters. Following the death of Henry of Grosmont, 1st Duke of Lancaster in 1361 Bolingbroke passed through marriage into the ownership of John of Gaunt. His wife Blanche of Lancaster, daughter of Henry of Grosmont, was born at the castle in 1342. John and Blanche's son, Henry (the future Henry IV), was also born at Bolingbroke Castle in 1367 and consequently was known as "Henry Bolingbroke" before he became king in 1399.

By the 15th and 16th century, the castle had fallen into disrepair although repairs were carried out during the Tudor period. In 1636 a survey found that all of the towers were effectively beyond repair.

At the start of the First English Civil War, Bolingbroke was again put to use as a military fortification garrisoned by Royalist forces. In 1643 it was badly damaged in a siege during the Battle of Winceby. The following year, the castle was recaptured from the Parliamentarians but due to defeats elsewhere was relinquished again. In 1652 the castle was slighted to prevent any further use. The towers and walls were torn down and dumped into the moat.

The last major structure collapsed in 1815.

Present day

The castle, which is now a national monument, was excavated in the 1960s and 1970s. It was maintained by English Heritage until 1995 when Heritage Lincolnshire took charge. Much of the lower walls are still visible as are the ground floors of the towers.

In the summertime, the castle is home to numerous events including performances of Shakespeare.

See also
 Castles in Great Britain and Ireland
 List of castles in England

References

Sources

External links

Friends of Bolingbroke Castle
Heritage Trust of Lincolnshire: Bolingbroke Castle 

Castles in Lincolnshire
Tourist attractions in Lincolnshire
English Heritage sites in Lincolnshire
Ruins in Lincolnshire
Grade I listed castles
Grade I listed buildings in Lincolnshire
Ruined castles in England
Grade I listed ruins
Buildings and structures demolished in the 17th century